Bni Sidel Jbel (Tarifit: Bni Sidal Jbel, ⴱⵏⵉ ⵙⵉⴷⴰⵍ ⵊⴱⴻⵍ; Arabic:  بني سيدال الجبل) is a commune in the Nador Province of the Oriental administrative region of Morocco. At the time of the 2004 census, the commune had a total population of 9623 people living in 1890 households.

References

Populated places in Nador Province
Rural communes of Oriental (Morocco)